Limnonectes finchi, Finch's wart frog, is a species of frog in the family Dicroglossidae  endemic to Sabah, Malaysia, but it might well occur in adjacent Kalimantan.  Its natural habitats are tropical moist lowland forests. The main potential threat to this species is habitat loss caused by conversion of forests to oil palm plantations. L. finchi shows some parental care: male frogs guard eggs and carry the tadpoles to small rain pools on the forest floor where the rest of larval development occurs.

References

finchi
Endemic fauna of Malaysia
Amphibians of Malaysia
Endemic fauna of Borneo
Taxonomy articles created by Polbot
Amphibians described in 1966
Amphibians of Borneo